Overstep is Phish bassist Mike Gordon’s fourth solo studio album, following Moss, The Green Sparrow, and Inside In. It was released on February 25, 2014 on Megaplum/ATO Records.

Gordon and Scott Murawski penned the songs for Overstep during a series of writing retreats in New England. He turned over the producing reins to Paul Q. Kolderie (Radiohead, Uncle Tupelo, Pixies) and invited a few new players into the studio, including drummer Matt Chamberlain (Jon Brion, Fiona Apple). Distant industrial noise gradually gives way to lush guitars and welcoming vocal harmonies in “Ether,” the album opener, while “Jumping” is a rhythmic puzzle box, detailing a series of thoughts that take place in a fleeting 1.5 seconds. "Yarmouth Road", the infectious, reggae-inspired number is already familiar to Phish fans after its debut (along with “Say Something”) on the band’s Summer 2013 tour.

Many of these songs promise huge payoffs in a live environment, most notably two plunging grooves that seem capable of bringing a house down. “Tiny Little World” opens with a polite reverie about a fetching woman in a coffee shop, but morphs quickly into pulsing boogie as the narrator is carried away by desire and bravado. Debauched exhortations to dance surface again in “Face,” which chugs along atop Chamberlain’s simple but undeniable pocket.

The songs on Overstep also speak to Gordon’s evolving ability to develop three- dimensional characters, and to speak more directly to the truth of their condition. He hasn’t lost his appetite for metaphor, and he still leaves plenty of room for interpretation, but listeners may find themselves recognizing the human portraits in songs like “Say Something” and “Paint” in a way they haven’t in Gordon’s previous albums. Still, happily, Gordon embraces absurdity as he always has – conceptually, lyrically, and musically.

Track listing
All songs written by Mike Gordon and Scott Murawski.
"Ether" (6:18)
"Tiny Little World" (4:50)
"Jumping" (3:28)
"Yarmouth Road" (4:41)
"Say Something" (3:57)
"Face" (5:08)
"Paint" (3:34)
"Different World" (4:05)
"Peel" (5:03)
"Long Black Line" (3:33)
"Surface" (4:43)

Personnel
Musicians
Mike Gordon
Scott Murawski
Matt Chamberlain
Robert Walter
Tom Cleary
Brett Lanier
Production
 Produced and engineered by Paul Q. Kolderie
 Mastered by Fred Kevorkian
 Photography & Design by Chuck Anderson (No Pattern)
 Art Direction & Layout Design by Julia Mordaunt

References

External links
Mike Gordon's official website

Mike Gordon albums
2014 albums
Albums produced by Paul Q. Kolderie
ATO Records albums